Monofloral honey is a type of honey which has a distinctive flavor or other attribute due to its being predominantly from the nectar of a single plant species. It is stored and labeled separately so as to command a premium price. While there may never be an absolute monofloral type, some honeys are relatively pure due to the prodigious nectar production of a particular species, such as citrus (orange blossom honey), or there may be little else in bloom at the time.

Beekeepers learn the predominant nectar sources of their region, and often plan harvests to keep especially fine ones separate. For example, in the southern Appalachians, sourwood honey, from a small tree that blooms late in the season, is highly regarded. Beekeepers try to remove the previously produced dark and strong flavored tulip poplar honey, just before the sourwood bloom, so it does not mix with the lighter sourwood. During sourwood bloom, there is little else for the bees to forage.

Some types

See also 
 List of honey plants
 List of Northern American nectar sources for honey bees
 Nectar source

Notes

References

External links
Different types with picture
The honey locator from the National Honey Board.  Describes honey varietals and lists various purveyors of each.
Harnessing honey's healing power BBC News 2004-06-08

Honey

sv:Sorthonung